Farinole is a commune in the Haute-Corse department of France on the island of Corsica.

The village is located between the mountains and the sea between Saint-Florent and Negro with the two hamlets of Sparagaggio and Bracolaccia. It has good views of the gulf and the Désert des Agriates. The village has two sandy beaches and a pebble beach.

Population

See also
Torra di Ferringule
Communes of the Haute-Corse department

References

Communes of Haute-Corse